Robert Kobayashi (1925–2015)  was a Hawaiʻi-born artist who made abstract expressionist paintings at the beginning of his career and later produced pointillist paintings and pointillist-derived sculptures in the folk art tradition. Known for the "whimsical, childlike quality" of his work, he rarely exhibited in commercial galleries, preferring to work and display his creations in a studio called "Moe's Meat Market" that he and his wife owned in the NoLita section of Manhattan.

Early life and training

Kobayashi was born and raised in Honolulu, Hawaii. His parents having divorced before he was five, he and his four sisters lived with his mother on the northern fringe of the business district. After graduating from high school in 1944, he served in the U.S. Army until the end of World War II and then enrolled in the studio school of the Honolulu Art Academy. His instructors there included Louis Pohl and Willson Stamper, the latter of whom became Kobayashi's mentor. In 1949 Kobayashi moved to New York to study at the Brooklyn Museum Art School under John Ferren and in 1950 temporarily left the school in order to spend much of the year in Paris where his sister, Fumi, was then living. In 1954 he was hired as caretaker for the Museum of Modern Art's Japanese Exhibition House. After the house exhibit closed, Kobayashi stayed on as a warehouse worker at the museum, working there, with brief interruptions, until 1978.

Career

Before he opened his own gallery Kobayashi rarely offered his work for sale to the public. In 1950  he showed sculpture in the New York gallery owned by Samuel M. Kootz. In the late 1950s and early 1960s he showed works in an artist cooperative, the Brata Gallery. He was given his first solo exhibition in 1962 in a gallery called Gima's in Honolulu. In 1977 Kobayashi and his wife bought a building in what was then a run-down section of New York's Little Italy and turned its storefront shop into a gallery. The storefront had been a butcher shop called Moe's Meat Market and that became the name of the gallery as well.  They made living quarters and a studio upstairs and rented out apartments in the upper stories. Kobayashi showed his own and other artists' work intermittently during the first few years and in 2000 his wife and curator Phyllis Stigliano opened the gallery to the public as a full-time commercial gallery devoted to his work. Stigliano also began showing his work at her gallery in Brooklyn. In 1980 Kobayashi was given a solo exhibition at the Equator folk art gallery in SoHo and in 2001 he contributed work to a group exhibition at the Luise Ross Gallery on 57th Street. In 2009 he showed with two friends, Satoru Abe and Harry Tsuchindana, in a multi-gallery exhibition in Honolulu's Luxury Row & Cedar Street Galleries.

Kobayashi's appearances in exhibitions at museums and non-commercial galleries were also infrequent. As a student, in 1950, he participated in a show of 23 painters that his teacher John Ferren presented in New York's Argent Gallery. In 1952 he showed at the Honolulu Academy of Arts and a year later at Brooklyn Museum. In 1988, after seeing his work at Moe's Meat Market, Phyllis Stigliano put together a large exhibition of his work at the Nassau County Museum of Art and the following year he was included in two group shows, one at the Wunsch Arts Center in Glen Cove, N.Y., and the other at the Museum of Modern Art. In 2002 he contributed works to an exhibition in the East Galleries, New York University, and in 2005 he was included in a show at the Contemporary Museum, Honolulu.

On two occasions Kobayashi contributed drawings to publications. In 1991 he wrote and illustrated Maria Mazaretti Loves Spaghetti (Alfred A. Knopf, N.Y.). The book consists of two short stories, both of them based on the habits of his neighbor across the street, Mary Albanese. Writing in Newsday, a reviewer said "Kobayashi's full-page illustrations here are ebullient and his text has that special kind of simple, gentle humor that signifies a classic." He also made illustrations for a book written by a second grade student at Mariners Elementary School in Newport Beach, California and produced in a self-publishing house by her father: Annie and the Magic Book by Grace Vaughan (27 pages, AuthorHouse, Bloomington, Indiana, 2012).

Artistic style

Until the mid-1960s Kobayashi made paintings and sculptures in an abstract expressionist style. In 1950 Stuart Preston of The New York Times described a sculpture of his as a "restless and urgent abstract." A few years later another critic said his works were "based on a wiry, expansive imagery composed of tensile lines vibrating from central axes." From the mid-1960s to the mid-1980s he made pointillist paintings, some of them in a surrealist style. His painting, "Seascape" was completed toward the end of this period. In a surrealist manner it shows a sandy shore on which the waves have cast up a button, a pocket watch, a lock, and a fork. As one critic noted, its technique is pointillist and its style draws on folk and native art. 

After he moved into the building that contained Moe's Meat Market, he began to work in sheet metal, making portraits and still lifes using metal obtained from discarded stamped ceiling tin and cans that had held olive oil, beer, or ground coffee. These pieces, which a critic dubbed "clouages," were nailed into a wood frames and contained decorative patterns made of many tiny nails. Critics saw them as strange and whimsical, a kind of idiosyncratic folk art having a childlike quality. One late piece in this style is "Nine White Flowers" of 2013. A critic noted that  "despite the coldness one would expect from the medium of tin, Kobi’s work subtly suggests a gentle wit and a delicate touch.  The rigid nature of the metal is softened into a suppleness of shape and color.  The chill warms with the nimble diligence of his fingers guided with the expressiveness of his affectionate mind."

Throughout his career Kobayashi made free-standing sculptures as well as wall-mounted works.  Some of these were toy-like objects such as a cat in a four-poster bed fashioned out of an old radio, a stool with sneakers on its four legs, and wooden puppets. Others were more traditionally artistic, such as portraits of friends and relatives or flower arrangements. "Flowers Seeking Affection" (2002) is an example of the last named. A critic said, "within these flowers there is the charm in the uniqueness of each bloom gesturing with personality."

Personal life and family

Kobayashi was born on May 5, 1925. His father, Hiroshi Kobayashi, was a post office clerk, born in Hawaii Territory in 1896. Having obtained a divorce in the early 1920s, Kobayashi's mother, Yoshimi Kusaka Kobayashi, had full responsibility for raising him and his four sisters. Kobayashi attended local schools in Honolulu and graduated in 1945 from McKinley High School. He joined the U.S. Army in April 1945, served as a private with an Army tank battalion in Germany, and was discharged not long after the war came to a close.

In 1946, at the urging of his sister Fumi (or Peggy), he used the G.I. Bill to attend art school, first in Honolulu and then in New York. He spend about a year in Paris and in the mid-1950s obtained work first as a gardener and later as part of the warehouse staff at the Museum of Modern Art. He left the museum in 1978 having bought the building that contained Moe's Meat Market the year before. Some years after Moe's Meat Market was transformed into a full-time gallery, Kobayashi's health began to fail. He and his wife then returned to Honolulu, and bought a home in the Manoa neighborhood where he died on December 14, 2015.

Other names used

Kobayashi used the nickname Kobi, as in Kobi Kobayashi. In the United States Census of 1930 his given name appears as Hiroshi. In the Census of 1940 it appears as Robert. His obituary in the New York Times gives his full name as Robert Hiroshi Kobayashi.

Notes

References

1925 births
2015 deaths
20th-century American artists
21st-century American artists
Artists from Hawaii